Piding is an approved climatic spa in Bavaria near to the border of Austria close to Bad Reichenhall and Freilassing.

Geography

Geographical position
Piding is located in the middle of the Landkreis Berchtesgadener Land.

The municipal area corresponds to a natural expanse: It is bounded by the mountains Hochstaufen (1771 m) and Fuderheuberg (1.350 m) in the South, by the river Saalach in the East and by the hill Högl in the North-West. In the North-East the Saalach shapes the borderline to Salzburg (Austria).

Districts and Neighbours
The districts are Piding, Kleinhögl, Bichlbruck, Urwies, Mauthausen, Staufenbrücke and Pidingerau.

Immediate neighbours are the town Bad Reichenhall and the municipalities Ainring and Anger.

History
Archaeological troves shows, that the region was already populated in the New Stone Age (about 2800 BC). During the construction of the (former) ski-lift at the Fuderheuberg in 1970 copper bars from the Bronze Age were found.

Religions
The Catholic parish Maria Geburt (birth of Mary) is responsible for this churches:
 parish church  Maria Geburt (Piding)
 St. Laurentius (Mauthausen)
 St. Johannes at Johannishögl (no regular masses)

Development of population
1790: 635 inhabitants; 1910: 864; 1946: 1,540; 1985: 3,996; 2000: 5,093; 2002: 5,257.

Coat of arms
The municipal coat of arms from 1962 refers to the former relations to arch-monastery and chapter Salzburg (black lion's head) and to the Höglwörth Abbey (cross-over silver keys).

Politics

Municipal council
Elections in 2014
 CSU: 9 seats
 Free voters: 6 seats
 Alliance 90/The Greens: 3 seats
 SPD: 2 seats

Mayor
First (governing) mayor is Hannes Holzner (CSU), second mayor Walter Pfannerstill (FWG) and third mayor Dr. Bernhard Zimmer (Grüne).

Culture and sights

Music/Tradition
Club for the preservation of traditional costumes, "D'Staufenecker"
Traditional band

Buildings
Schloss Staufeneck

Sport
tennis hall, tennis courts
 hiking trails,  cross-country ski runs (tracked)
Pidinger Klettersteig (fixed rope route) to the Hochstaufen
Football ground

Economy and infrastructure

Resident Companies
Autohaus Bachfrieder (car dealer)
Behindertenwerkstätte (workshop for handicapped people)
Milchwerke Berchtesgadener Land (dairy)
Stahl- und Metallbau Heinz Bender KG (metal constructions)

Traffic
Next to Piding is the last exit of the motorway A 8 (Munich-Salzburg) in front of the border to Austria. The federal road B 20 (Berchtesgaden-Oberpfalz) is tangent to Piding. Piding has its own railway station on the Freilassing-Berchtesgaden railway line.

Education
Primary and secondary school
Rupertusschule (school for handicapped persons)

Characters

Honorary citizens
Max Wieser: former mayor

Literature
Max Wieser: Pidinger Heimatbuch, 1250 Jahre Piding - Verlag Plenk, Berchtesgaden 1985

References

External links
 Official website
 Tourism website

Berchtesgadener Land